Nature's Valley is a holiday resort and small village on the Garden Route along the southern Cape coast of South Africa. Nature's Valley lies between the Salt River, the foothills of the Tsitsikamma Mountains, the Indian Ocean and the Groot River lagoon. Nature's Valley has a balmy climate and is surrounded by the de Vasselot Nature Reserve which is part of the Tsitsikamma Park, and in turn part of the Garden Route National Park.

History
Nature's Valley, and the surrounding coastline, was occupied by Old Stone Age or Paleolithic man from 1 million years ago. Paleolithic man lived in the area in caves and under overhangs, collecting food in the tidal zone and hunting for a rich variety of wildlife. Various glacial periods interrupted this coastal occupation. San hunter-gatherers lived in this area from about 10,000 years ago until they were displaced by Khoikhoi herders from the interior.

The Groot River pass

For a long time travel along the Garden Route parallel to the coastline was impossible, due to the extremely deep and precipitous river gorges blocking all east–west traffic. Charles Collier Michell reported in 1839: "there is no practical way – not even a footpath, from Plettenberg Bay to the Tzitzikamma country". Thomas Bain built a road from George to Knysna, the so-called "Seven Passes Road", which took from 1867 to 1883 to complete. Previously, access to the coastal area which lay further east was possible only via the Langkloof valley, which lies immediately north of the Tsitsikamma Mountains.

Nature's Valley only became easily accessible after Thomas Bain completed the Grootrivier Pass in 1880. He and Captain Christopher Harison (later Conservator of Forests) first explored the route in 1868 to test its feasibility. Harison's interest in the road stemmed from his belief that it could be used to halt the runaway destruction of the forest started by Dutch East India Company woodcutters in 1777 and carried on by their descendants. At the time that Bain and Harison reconnoitred the route, Bain was supervising the construction of no fewer than six passes, so that 10 years would elapse before he could start work on the Groot River Pass. A hundred years later the demands of road transport would dictate the building of a freeway with enormous concrete bridges – a tribute to the skill of engineers, and bringing in its wake considerable collateral damage to the environment.

Permanent settlement

After Bain's completion of the Groot River Pass, the Forestry Department proclaimed three lots in the Valley – one for its own use and the other two sold to private individuals. The first person to settle in the now accessible valley, and who acquired a 69-hectare lot from Telfer Anderson, was Hendrik Jacobus Hermanus Barnardo [also referred to as Hendrick Grootrivier] {uncle of Ignatius Phillip(Naas) Barnardo} who had been a foreman at Bain's Groot River construction camp. Barnardo was an enigmatic character who went to extreme lengths to protect the trees of the area, but enthusiastically led the slaughter of wildlife throughout the region. Barnardo married three times and fathered 19 children.

The names of his wife's,

(no first name) Van Rooyen; with children(4), Michael John, Christian Henry, Susie, Babes.

(no first name) Stroebel; with children(2), Harding Jouy, Hercule en Easy.

Luanna Toit; with children(6),Maggie, Willem, Eddy, Leon, Benny, Ivy. They lived at Covie, just opposite the graveyard where the forefathers and relatives were buried. It is still in existence (2022).

Another member of his family shot the last Tsitsikamma elephant in 1881.

In the face of continued pressure to sell a portion of his farm, Barnardo finally relented in 1941 and sold an area of 1.6963 morgen to a syndicate of ten buyers for the sum of £755. In 1943 Baron Ulrich Behr of Kurland bought the option to purchase the remainder of Barnardo's property from the Van Reenen family, who had acquired the option in the 1920s, but had never exercised it. Behr then went through all the steps necessary to have the land proclaimed for development. In 1953 the township was declared and formally named "Nature's Valley" by Behr, a name that had been used by the syndicate at the suggestion of Wide du Preez of "The Crags".

The Valley and surrounding area

A network of trails covers the surrounding hills and beaches. The lagoon offers sheltered water for sailing and canoeing, without powerboating and beach buggies. A walk along beaches and a rocky path leads to the Salt River Mouth after crossing Pebble Beach, a large area completely covered in sea-smoothed cobbles.

East of Nature's Valley is the Groot River Lagoon, which marks the end of the Otter Trail, starting at Storms River Mouth, 60 km further east. This 5-day trail is considered by many hikers to be the finest in South Africa, being strenuous, scenic and extremely varied. The route meanders along the coast through evergreen forest, past boulder-strewn beaches and frequently crossing tannin-stained streams. Huts are available for the hiker at the end of each day, but bookings have to be made well in advance.

The Brenton blue butterfly, Orachrysops niobe, was first described from Knysna by Roland Trimen in 1858, and was not seen again until discovered in 1977 at Nature's Valley and shortly thereafter in 1979 at Brenton-on-Sea. The Nature's Valley population was assumed to be extinct when no more sightings were made after 1984. The cause of this decline was felt to be the absence of fynbos fires causing a shortage of the butterfly's foodplant Indigofera erecta, and accordingly a controlled burn was carried out in April 2003, with a reintroduction of butterfly eggs in August 2005.

In 2000 researchers from the Albany Museum in Grahamstown discovered a number of aquatic insect species new to science in the Salt River, which lies at the western end of Nature's Valley. The isolated position of the river, a lack of fish and its acidic and unpolluted water are thought to have been factors in ensuring the undisturbed survival of these primitive forms. New housing developments within the catchment area of the Salt River may threaten the continued existence of these unique insects.

Wildlife

Mammals

Duthie's golden mole, Chlorotalpa duthieae
Hottentot golden mole, Amblysomus hottentotus devilliersi
Amblysomus iris
Forest shrew, Myosorex varius
Greater red musk shrew, Crocidura flavescens
Egyptian fruit bat, Rousettus aegyptiacus leachii
Geoffroy's horseshoe bat, Rhinolophus clivosus
Cape horseshoe bat, Rhinolophus capensis
Egyptian slit-faced bat, Nycteris thebaica
Lesser long-fingered bat, Miniopterus fraterculus
Lesser woolly bat, Kerivoula lanosa
Cape hairy bat, Myotis tricolor
Kuhl's pipistrelle, Pipistrellus kuhlii 
Long-tailed house bat, Eptesicus hottentotus
Vervet monkey, Cercopithecus pygerythrus
Chacma baboon, Papio ursinus
Scrub hare, Lepus saxatilis
Verreaux's mouse, Myomyscus verreauxi
Woodland thicket rat, Thamnomys dolichurus
Vlei rat, Otomys irroratus
Brant's climbing mouse, Dendromus mesomelas
Spectacled dormouse, Graphiurus ocularis
Woodland dormouse, Graphiurus murinus
Cape porcupine, Hystrix africae-australis 
Cape dune mole-rat, Bathyergus suillus
Cape mole-rat, Georychus capensis
Common mole-rat, Cryptomys hottentotus
Honey badger, Mellivora capensis
Striped polecat, Ictonyx striatus
African clawless otter, Aonyx capensis
Cape genet, Genetta tigrina
Egyptian mongoose, Herpestes ichneumon cafer
Cape grey mongoose, Herpestes pulverulentus 
Marsh mongoose, Atilax paludinosus
African wildcat, Felis lybica
Serval, Leptailurus serval
Caracal, Caracal caracal
Leopard, Panthera pardus
African bush elephant, Loxodonta africana
Cape hyrax, Procavia capensis
Bushpig, Potamochoerus porcus
Grey rhebok, Pelea capreolus
Bushbuck, Tragelaphus scriptus sylvaticus
Blue duiker, Cephalophus monticola
Klipspringer, Oreotragus oreotragus
Cape grysbok, Raphicerus melanotis

Birds

Cape spurfowl
Red-necked spurfowl
Common quail
Helmeted guineafowl
Egyptian goose
African black duck
Yellow-billed duck
Red-billed teal
Scaly-throated honeyguide
Greater honeyguide
Lesser honeyguide
Brown-backed honeybird
Knysna woodpecker
Cardinal woodpecker
Olive woodpecker
Crowned hornbill
African hoopoe
Green wood hoopoe
Narina trogon
European roller
Half-collared kingfisher
Malachite kingfisher
Brown-hooded kingfisher
Giant kingfisher
Pied kingfisher
Speckled mousebird
Red-faced mousebird
Red-chested cuckoo
Black cuckoo
Klaas's cuckoo
African emerald cuckoo
Diederik cuckoo
Burchell's coucal
Alpine swift
African black swift
Little swift
Horus swift
White-rumped swift
Knysna turaco
Barn owl
Cape eagle-owl
Spotted eagle-owl
African wood owl
Fiery-necked nightjar
European nightjar
Rock dove
Lemon dove
Laughing dove
Cape turtle dove
Red-eyed dove
Tambourine dove
Emerald-spotted wood dove
Speckled pigeon
African olive pigeon
Denham's bustard
African finfoot
Buff-spotted flufftail
Striped flufftail
Common moorhen
Red-knobbed coot
Common whimbrel
Common greenshank
Marsh sandpiper
Wood sandpiper
Common sandpiper
Ruddy turnstone
Sanderling
Ruff
Water thick-knee
Spotted thick-knee
African black oystercatcher
Black-winged stilt
Grey plover
White-fronted plover
Blacksmith lapwing
Black-winged lapwing
Arctic skua
Kelp gull
Grey-headed gull
Caspian tern
Swift tern
Sandwich tern
Roseate tern
Common tern
Arctic tern
Osprey
Black-winged kite
African marsh harrier
Black harrier
African harrier-hawk
African cuckoo-hawk
African goshawk
Little sparrowhawk
Rufous-chested sparrowhawk
Black sparrowhawk
Palmnut vulture
Steppe buzzard
Forest buzzard
Jackal buzzard
Black eagle
Booted eagle
Martial eagle
Long-crested eagle
African crowned eagle
African fish eagle
Rock kestrel
Peregrine falcon
White-faced whistling duck
Little grebe
Red-tailed tropicbird
Cape gannet
African darter
Reed cormorant
Crowned cormorant
White-breasted cormorant
Cape cormorant
Little egret
Cattle egret
Grey heron
Black-headed heron
Purple heron
Green-backed heron
Black-crowned night heron
White-backed night heron
Dwarf bittern
Hamerkop
Lesser flamingo
Hadeda ibis
African sacred ibis
African spoonbill
Great frigatebird
African penguin
Indian yellow-nosed albatross
Southern giant petrel
Pintado petrel
Blue petrel
White-chinned petrel
Black-headed oriole
Fork-tailed drongo
Blue-mantled crested flycatcher
African paradise flycatcher
Black-backed puffback
Southern tchagra
Southern boubou
Olive bushshrike
Cape batis
Cape crow
Pied crow
White-necked raven
Southern fiscal
Grey cuckooshrike
Black cuckooshrike
Barn swallow
White-throated swallow
Greater striped swallow
Brown-throated martin
Rock martin
Common house martin
Black saw-wing
Cape bulbul
Sombre greenbul
Terrestrial brownbul
Cape grassbird
Victorin's warbler
Long-billed crombec
Little rush warbler
Knysna warbler
Yellow-throated woodland warbler
Willow warbler
Cape white-eye
Grey-backed cisticola
Levaillant's cisticola
Neddicky
Karoo prinia
Bar-throated apalis
Bleating warbler
Cape rock thrush
Olive thrush
Southern black flycatcher
Fiscal flycatcher
Spotted flycatcher
African dusky flycatcher
White-starred robin
Cape robin-chat
Chorister robin-chat
White-browed scrub robin
African stonechat
Red-winged starling
Black-bellied starling
Wattled starling
Common starling
Orange-breasted sunbird
Grey sunbird
Amethyst sunbird
Malachite sunbird
Collared sunbird
Southern double-collared sunbird
Greater double-collared sunbird
Cape sugarbird
Cape weaver
Yellow bishop
African quailfinch
Swee waxbill
Common waxbill
African firefinch
Pin-tailed whydah
House sparrow
Southern grey-headed sparrow
Cape wagtail
Cape canary
Brimstone canary
White-throated canary
Protea seedeater
Streaky-headed seedeater
Cape siskin
Golden-breasted bunting

Amphibians

 Breviceps fuscus - Plain rain frog/blaasoppie
 Amietophrynus rangeri – Ranger's toad
 Cacosternum boettgeri – Boettger's dainty frog
 Hyperolius horstockii – Arum frog
 Amietia fuscigula – Cape river frog
 Strongylopus bonaspei – Banded stream frog
 Strongylopus grayii – Gray's stream frog
 Tomopterna delalandii – Delalande's sand frog
 Xenopus laevis – African clawed frog

Snakes

Pelamis platurus - yellow-bellied sea snake
Rhinotyphlops lalandei – pink earth snake
Leptotyphlops nigricans – black worm snake
Lycodonomorphus rufulus – brown water snake
Lycophidion capense - Cape wolf snake
Lamprophis aurora – Aurora snake
Lycodonomorphus inornatus – olive house snake
Boaedon fuliginosus – brown house snake
Philothamnus hoplogaster – green water snake
Philothamnus natalensis – Natal green snake
Prosymna sundevallii – southern shovel-snout snake
Pseudaspis cana – mole snake
Duberria lutrix – slug-eater snake
Dasypeltis scabra – common egg-eater snake
Crotaphopeltis hotamboeia – red-lipped snake
Amplorhinus multimaculatus – reed snake
Dispholidus typus – boomslang
Psammophylax rhombeatus – spotted grass snake
Psammophis crucifer – cross-marked grass snake
Homoroselaps lacteus – spotted harlequin snake
Hemachatus haemachatus – rinkhals
Naja nivea – Cape cobra
Causus rhombeatus – night adder
Bitis arietans – puff adder
Bitis atropos – berg adder
Bitis albanica – hornsman adder

Lizards

 Pachydactylus geitjie - Ocellated thick-toed gecko
 Afrogecko porphyreus – Marbled leaf-toed gecko
 Lygodactylus capensis - Cape dwarf gecko
 Agama atra – Southern rock agama
 Bradypodion damaranum – Knysna dwarf chameleon
 Ninurta coeruleopunctatus – Blue-spotted girdled lizard
 Acontias meleagris - Cape legless skink
 Eremias lineocelata - Sand lizard
 Pedioplanis lineocellata - Spotted sand lizard
 Trachylepis capensis – Cape skink
 Trachylepis homalocephala - Red-sided skink
 Gerrhosaurus flavigularis - Yellow-throated plated lizard
 Tetradactylus seps - Short-legged seps
 Chamaesaura anguina - Cape grass lizard
 Cordylus cordylus - Cape girdled lizard
 Pseudocordylus microlepidotus - Cape crag lizard
 Tropidosaura gularis - Yellow-striped mountain lizard
 Varanus exanthematicus - Rock monitor

Tortoises, turtles and terrapins

 Eretmochelys imbricata - Hawksbill sea turtle
 Chelonia mydas - Green turtle
 Caretta caretta - loggerhead turtle
 Dermochelys coriacea - leatherback turtle
 Stigmochelys pardalis - leopard tortoise  
 Chersina angulata - angulate tortoise
 Homopus areolatus - common padloper
 Pelomedusa subrufa - marsh terrapin

Trees, shrubs and lianes

Acokanthera oppositifolia
Afrocanthium mundianum
Afrocarpus falcatus
Allophylus decipiens
Apodytes dimidiata
Berzelia intermedia
Brachylaena glabra
Brachylaena neriifolia
Brunia nodiflora
Buddleja saligna
Buddleja salviifolia
Burchellia bubalina
Calodendrum capense
Canthium kuntzeanum
Canthium ventosum
Capparis sepiaria var. citrifolia
Carissa bispinosa
Cassine aethopica
Cassine crocea
Cassine eucleaeformis
Cassine papillosa
Cassine parvifolia
Cassine peragua
Cassine tetragona
Cassinopsis ilicifolia
Celtis africana
Chionanthus foveolatus subsp. foveolatus
Chrysanthemoides monilifera
Clausena anisata
Clematis brachiata
Clutia affinis
Colpoon compressum
Cunonia capensis
Curtisia dentata
Cussonia thyrsiflora
Cyathea capensis (L.f.) J. E. Sm.
Cynanchum ellipticum (Harv.) R. A. Dyer
Diospyros dichrophylla
Diospyros glabra
Diospyros whyteana
Dodonaea viscosa var. angustifolia
Dovyalis rhamnoides
Ekebergia capensis
Empleurum unicapsulare (L. f.) Skeels
Erica floribunda
Euclea polyandra
Euclea racemosa
Euclea schimperi var. schimperi
Euclea undulata
Euryops virgineus (L.f.) DC.
Excoecaria simii (Kuntze) Pax
Faurea macnaughtonii
Ficus burtt-davyi
Ficus sur
Gnidia denudata
Gonioma kamassi
Grewia occidentalis
Gymnanthemum mespilifolium (Less.) H.Rob.
Halleria lucida
Hartogiella schinoides Codd
Heteromorpha arborescens
Hippobromus pauciflorus
Ilex mitis
Kiggelaria africana
Lachnostylis hirta
Laurophyllus capensis
Leucadendron adscendens
Leucadendron conicum
Leucadendron eucalyptifolium
Leucospermum attenuatum
Maerua cafra
Maerua racemulosa
Maytenus acuminata
Maytenus heterophylla
Maytenus nemorosa (Eckl. & Zeyh.) Marais
Maytenus peduncularis
Myrica humilis
Myrica cordifolia
Myrica serrata
Nuxia floribunda
Ochna arborea
Ocotea bullata
Olea capensis subsp. capensis
Olea capensis subsp. macrocarpa
  Olea europaea subsp. cuspidata
Olea exasperata
Olinia cymosa
Passerina falcifolia
Phylica paniculata Willd.
Pittosporum viridiflorum
Platylophus trifoliatus
Podocarpus latifolius
Polygala myrtifolia
Protea mundii
Protea neriifolia
Prunus africana
Pseudophyllanthus ovalis
Psoralea pinnata
Psychotria capensis
Psydrax obovata
Pterocelastrus rostratus
Pterocelastrus tricuspidatus
Pyrenacantha scandens Planch. ex Harv.
Rapanea melanophloeos
Rhamnus prinoides
Rhoicissus tomentosa
Rhus chirindensis
Rhus crenata
Rhus glauca
Rhus longispina
Rhus lucida
Rhus tomentosa
Rhus undulata
Rothmannia capensis
Salix mucronata subsp. capensis
Schefflera umbellifera
Scutia myrtina
Secamone alpini
Schotia afra var. afra
Schotia latifolia
Scolopia mundii
Scolopia zeyheri
Secamone alpini
Sideroxylon inerme
Sparrmannia africana
Strelitzia alba
Strychnos decussata
Tarchonanthus camphoratus
Trichocladus crinitus
Trimeria grandifolia
Vepris lanceolata
Virgilia oroboides
Zanthoxylum capense
Zanthoxylum davyi

See also
Tsitsikamma National Park
Garden Route
Plettenberg Bay
Keurboomstrand, Western Cape

References

Southern Cape Forests and Trees – F von Breitenbach (Government Printer, Pretoria 1974) 
A Checklist of Birds of Nature's Valley – Geoff McIlleron (Nature's Valley Trust 2005)
The Story of Nature's Valley – Nora and Chris Sinclair (Nature's Valley Trust 2005)
Pristine river threatened by projects
Nature's Valley newsletter
Getaway Magazine article
Ross, Graham – The Romance of Cape Mountain Passes (David Philip, Cape Town 2002)

External links

 
Nature's Valley Ratepayers Association
 Cederberg Snakes

Populated places in the Bitou Local Municipality